Vera Yevgenievna Zelinskaya (26 August 1944 – 6 June 2021) was a Russian film production designer of among others Window to Paris, Time for Sorrow Hasn't Come Yet and Of Freaks and Men.

She won Best Art Direction at 1998 Russian Guild of Film Critics Awards for her work on Of Freaks and Men.

Zelinskaya died in Saint Petersburg on 6 June 2021, aged 74.

References

External links 

 

Russian designers
Russian women
1944 births
2021 deaths
People from Novosibirsk
Recipients of the Nika Award
Saint Petersburg Stieglitz State Academy of Art and Design alumni